Cayman Islands passports are a variant of the British passport which are issued to British Overseas Territories Citizens connected to the Cayman Islands. Since 2016, all Caymanian passports are issued in the United Kingdom by His Majesty's Passport Office (HMPO).

Following the introduction of the Series C British Passport, Caymanian passports, along with the other Overseas Territories, will adopt the new blue design.

Caymanian status
As Cayman Islands passports are issued to any BOTC with a connection to the islands, it does not necessarily confer "Caymanian" status. As such Cayman Islands passports do not confer to anyone a right to live in, work in or even enter the Cayman Islands.

See also
 Visa requirements for British Overseas Territories Citizens
 Visa & Passport Photos That Meet Requirements
 Cayman passport information on PRADO

References

External links
Official website of the Cayman Islands Passport Office

British passports issued to British Overseas Territories Citizens
Passport
Passports by country